André Kimbu Mboma (born 21 September 1962) is a Congolese former professional boxer who competed from 1984 to 1994. As an amateur, he competed in the men's lightweight event at the 1984 Summer Olympics.

References

External links
 

1962 births
Living people
Democratic Republic of the Congo male boxers
Olympic boxers of the Democratic Republic of the Congo
Boxers at the 1984 Summer Olympics
Place of birth missing (living people)
Lightweight boxers
21st-century Democratic Republic of the Congo people